South Abaco is one of the districts of the Bahamas, on the Abaco Islands.

The district had a population of 7,646 in 2010. Sandy Point is one of the largest settlements.

References

Districts of the Bahamas
Abaco Islands